Frédéric Dagée (born 11 December 1992 in Montargis, Loiret) is a French athlete specialising in the shot put. He won the U23 category at the 2014 European Cup Winter Throwing.

His personal bests in the event are 20.75 metres outdoors (Angers 2021, national record) and 20.36 metres indoors (Nice 2018).

International competitions

References

1992 births
Living people
Belarusian male shot putters
People from Montargis
French Athletics Championships winners
Sportspeople from Loiret